The Economy of Somaliland largely relies on primary production and agriculture, where livestock is the main export of the country, which it ships to neighbouring Djibouti and Ethiopia, as well as to Gulf states, such as UAE, Saudi Arabia and Oman. Somaliland has a gross domestic product (GDP) of about US$720 million as of 2022, most of which it receives in remittances from Somalis working abroad. The COVID-19 pandemic has restricted Somaliland's trade flows with decreased demand in the agriculture sector, a significant source of tax revenue. The country's GDP per capita is approximately US$1530 which is one of the lowest in the world.

Somaliland is located along the Gulf of Aden, near the entrance to the Bab al-Mandeb, a major sea-lane through which almost one-third of the world's shipping passes. Its location has helped the government attract new trade and development deals. In late 2016, the DP World announced that it would invest nearly US$450 million to manage and upgrade the Port of Berbera and  develop a corridor running from the Port to the Ethiopian border. In 2021 the project was joined by the UK government's CDC Group which has doubled the funding.

Overview

The Somaliland shilling, which cannot easily be exchanged outside Somaliland on account of the nation's lack of recognition, is regulated by the Bank of Somaliland, the central bank, which was established constitutionally in 1994.

Since Somaliland is unrecognised, international donors have found it difficult to provide aid. As a result, the government relies mainly upon tax receipts and remittances from the large Somali diaspora, which contribute immensely to Somaliland's economy. Remittances come to Somaliland through money transfer companies, the largest of which is Dahabshiil, one of the few Somali money transfer companies that conform to modern money-transfer regulations. The World Bank estimates that remittances worth approximately US$1 billion reach Somalia annually from émigrés working in the Gulf states, Europe and the United States. Analysts say that Dahabshiil may handle around two-thirds of that figure and as much as half of it reaches Somaliland alone.

Since the late 1990s, service provisions have significantly improved through limited government provisions and contributions from non-governmental organisations, religious groups, the international community (especially the diaspora), and the growing private sector. Local and municipal governments have been developing key public service provisions such as water in Hargeisa and education, electricity, and security in Berbera. In 2009, the Banque pour le Commerce et l'Industrie – Mer Rouge (BCIMR), based in Djibouti, opened a branch in Hargeisa and became the first bank in the country since the 1990 collapse of the Commercial and Savings Bank of Somalia. In 2014, Dahabshil Bank International became the region's first commercial bank. In 2017 Premier Bank from Mogadishu opened a branch in Hargeisa.

Various telecommunications firms also have branches in Somaliland. Among these companies is Telesom, one of the largest operators in Somaliland. Founded in 2002 with the objective of supplying the local market with telecommunications services such as GSM, fixed line, and Internet access, it has an extensive network that covers all of Somaliland's major cities and more than 40 districts in both Somalia and Somaliland. Telesom also offers among the cheapest international calling rates at US$0.2 less than its nearest competitor. Other telecommunication firms serving the region include Somtel, Telcom and NationLink.

Livestock is the backbone of Somaliland's economy. Sheep, camels, and cattle are shipped from the Berbera port and sent to Gulf Arab countries, such as Saudi Arabia. The country is home to some of the largest livestock markets, known in Somali as seylad, in the Horn of Africa, with as many as 10,000 heads of sheep and goats sold daily in the markets of Burao and Yirowe, many of whom shipped to Gulf states via the port of Berbera. The market handles livestock from all over the Horn of Africa.

Agriculture is generally considered to be a potentially successful industry, especially in the production of cereals and horticulture. Mining also has potential, though simple quarrying represents the extent of current operations, despite the presence of diverse quantities of mineral deposits.

Tourism

The rock art and caves at Laas Geel, situated on the outskirts of Hargeisa, are a popular local tourist attraction. Totaling ten caves, they were discovered by a French archaeological team in 2002 and are believed to date back around 5,000 years. The government and locals keep the cave paintings safe and only a restricted number of tourists are allowed entry. Other notable sights include the Freedom Arch in Hargeisa and the War Memorial in the city centre. Natural attractions are very common around the region. The Naasa Hablood are twin hills located on the outskirts of Hargeisa that Somalis in the region consider to be a majestic natural landmark.

The Ministry of Commerce, Industries and Tourism has also encouraged travellers to visit historic towns and cities in Somaliland. The historic town of Sheikh is located near Berbera and is home to old British colonial buildings that have remained untouched for over forty years. Berbera also houses historic and impressive Ottoman architectural buildings. Another equally famous historic city is Zeila. Zeila was once part of the Ottoman Empire, a dependency of Yemen and Egypt and a major trade city during the 19th century. The city has been visited for its old colonial landmarks, offshore mangroves and coral reefs, towering cliffs, and beach. The nomadic culture of Somaliland has also attracted tourists. Most nomads live in the countryside.

Transport

Bus services operate in Hargeisa, Burao, Gabiley, Berbera and Borama. There are also road transportation services between the major towns and adjacent villages, which are operated by different types of vehicles. Among these are taxis, four-wheel drives, minibuses and light goods vehicles (LGV).

The most prominent airlines serving Somaliland is Daallo Airlines, a Somali-owned private carrier with regular international flights that emerged after Somali Airlines ceased operations. African Express Airways and Ethiopian Airlines also fly from airports in Somaliland to Djibouti City, Addis Ababa, Dubai and Jeddah, and offer flights for the Hajj and Umrah pilgrimages via the Egal International Airport in Hargeisa. Other major airports in the country include the Berbera Airport.

Ports 
In June 2016, the Somaliland government signed an agreement with DP World to manage the strategic port of Berbera with the aim of enhancing productive capacity and acting as an alternative port for landlocked Ethiopia. In 2021 the project was joined by the UK government's CDC Group which has doubled the funding, making Berbera a $1 billion investment.

Oil explorations 
In August 2012, the Somaliland government awarded Genel Energy license to explore oil within its territory. Results of a surface seep study completed early in 2015 confirmed the outstanding potential offered in SL-10B and SL-13 block and Oodweyne block with estimated oil reserves of 1 billion barrel each. Genel Energy is set to drill exploration well for SL-10B and SL-13 block in Buur-Dhaab 20 kilometers northwest of Aynabo by the end of 2018.

See also

Agriculture in Somaliland
Ministry of Finance (Somaliland)
Ministry of Investment Promotion (Somaliland)

References